Dmitri Aleksandrovich Proshin (born 6 January 1984) is a Russian professional football coach and a former player.

Club career
He made his Russian Football National League debut for FC Tosno on 31 August 2015 in a game against FC Volgar Astrakhan.

On 3 August 2019, Proshin announced that he would retire and continue as a youth coach at a Sports School in Pushkin, Saint Petersburg.

References

External links
 

1984 births
People from Veliky Novgorod
Living people
Russian footballers
Association football midfielders
Russian expatriate footballers
Russian expatriate sportspeople in Estonia
Expatriate footballers in Estonia
FC Tosno players
JK Narva Trans players
FC Petrotrest players
FC Sever Murmansk players
Meistriliiga players
Sportspeople from Novgorod Oblast
Russian football managers
FC Dynamo Saint Petersburg managers